Scott Gordon Borek is an American ice hockey player and coach who has been involved with college hockey for over 35 years. Currently, Borek is the head coach at Merrimack College.

Career
Borek started his college playing career at Dartmouth in 1981 and had nearly tripled his point production in his sophomore season when a neck injury forced him to end his playing days prematurely. He remained a member of the Big Green by becoming a student assistant the following year and after graduating with a degree in English. He became a full-time coach with Providence becoming his next stop. After seven years in Rhode Island (3 with the Friars and 4 more with Brown) got his first head coaching gig with Division III Colby. Borek was back at the Division I level three years later as an associate coach for Lake Superior State and then head coach a year later.

Borek was taking over from Jeff Jackson after a brief but historic career that saw the Lakers win two national titles in three years. Predictably the results weren't as great as they had been under his old boss but after five years the team appeared to be mired in mediocrity and was fired following the 2001 season. After a year behind the bench at New England College Borek became an assistant at New Hampshire for Dick Umile. He remained with the Wildcats until 2015 when he returned to his old stomping grounds as an associate coach for Providence.

Borek was hired as the head coach at Merrimack College on April 9, 2018.

Personal life
Scott's son Gordon was killed in a single-car accident on May 28, 2016. He married Jill McCune on August 18, 2017. Together they have a total of seven children.

Head coaching record

References

External links
 Official Biography, Merrimack Warriors
 

1962 births
Living people
American ice hockey coaches
American men's ice hockey forwards
Brown Bears men's ice hockey coaches
Colby Mules men's ice hockey coaches
Dartmouth Big Green men's ice hockey coaches
Dartmouth Big Green men's ice hockey players
Ice hockey players from Massachusetts
Lake Superior State Lakers men's ice hockey coaches
New England College Pilgrims men's ice hockey coaches
New Hampshire Wildcats men's ice hockey coaches
People from Swampscott, Massachusetts
Providence Friars men's ice hockey coaches
Sportspeople from Essex County, Massachusetts
Ice hockey coaches from Massachusetts